Seth Williams may refer to:

Seth Williams (1822–1866), American military officer
Seth Williams (USMC) (1880–1963), American military officer who served as Quartermaster General of the U.S. Marine Corps
Seth Williams (defensive back) (born 1986), American football defensive back
Seth Williams (wide receiver) (born 2000), American football wide receiver
R. Seth Williams (born 1967), Philadelphia District Attorney